Desolation Canyon is a 2006 American Western television film starring Stacy Keach and Patrick Duffy. The film was written by Dan Fitzsimons, directed by David S. Cass Sr. and premiered on Hallmark Channel on July 1, 2006.

Plot
After a bank robbery, the responsible gang stops by the home of one of their band's estranged wife to abduct his own young son. The town's old sheriff (Patrick Duffy) calls for the help of a retired gunfighter (Stacy Keach), who is also the abducted boy's grandfather. Hot on the trail of the fugitives, they discover that two bounty hunters are already in pursuit of the gang for crimes committed in Mexico.

Cast
 Stacy Keach as Samuel Kendrick
 Patrick Duffy as Sheriff Tomas 'Swede' Lundstrom
 Kenneth Johnson as Press Reynolds
 Yvonne DeLaRosa as Alejandra Kendrick
 Kelly Overton as Olivia Kendrick
 David Rees Snell as Edwin
 Courtney Gains as Jack
 Victor Browne as Johnny Kendrick
 A Martinez as Arturo Zetta
 Cubbie Kile as Molly Kendrick
 Michael Patrick McGill as Cecil 'Slim' Moldin
 Franc Ross as Cleon Winters
 Drake Johnston as Abe Kendrick
 Tom Kiesche as Billy McAllister

Reception
Entertainment Weekly's critic gave the film a C+ rating.  However, the film achieved some success; it achieved 2.4 HH (household) ratings, and it was the highest-rated ad-supported cable movie of the day, with nearly 1.8 million homes.

References

External links
 
 Desolation Canyon  at Hallmark Channel
 
 Desolation Canyon at HallmarkChannel.tv

2006 television films
2006 films
2006 Western (genre) films
Films directed by David S. Cass Sr.
Hallmark Channel original films
American Western (genre) television films
2000s English-language films